Plants For A Future (PFAF) is an online not for profit resource for those interested in edible and useful plants, with a focus on temperate regions. Named after the phrase "plans for a future" as wordplay, the organization's emphasis is on perennial plants.

PFAF is a registered educational charity with the following objectives:

The website contains an online database of over 8000 plants: 7000 that can be grown in temperate regions including in the UK, and 1000 plants for tropical situations.

The database was originally set up by Ken Fern to include 1,500 plants which he had grown on his 28 acre research site in the South West of England.

Since 2008, the database  has been maintained by the database administrator employed by the Plants For A Future Charity.

The organization participates in public discussion by publishing books. Members have participated in various conferences and are also participants in the International Permaculture Research Project.

Publications
Fern, Ken. Plants for a Future: Edible and Useful Plants for a Healthier World. Hampshire: Permanent Publications, 1997. .
Edible Plants: An inspirational guide to choosing and growing unusual edible plants. 2012 
Woodland Gardening: Designing a low-maintenance, sustainable edible woodland garden. 2013. 
Edible Trees: A practical and inspirational guide from Plants For A Future on how to grow and harvest trees with edible and other useful produce. 2013. 
Plantes Comestibles: Le guide pour vous inspirer à choisir et cultiver des plantes comestibles hors du commun. 2014. 
Edible Perennials: 50 Top perennial plants from Plants For A Future. 2015.
Edible Shrubs: 70+ Top Shrubs from Plants For A Future 
Plants for Your Food Forest: 500 Plants for Temperate Food Forests and Permaculture Gardens.  2021.

See also
 Forest gardening
 Postcode Plants Database

References

Further reading

External links

 

Online botany databases
Charities based in Devon
Vegan organic gardening
Permaculture organizations
Databases in England
Horticultural organisations based in the United Kingdom